Zsahleya Aisha Ibrahim (born in Iligan City, Philippines) is the executive chef at the Seattle restaurant Canlis.  Her partner Samantha Beaird also works at Canlis as a research and development chef.  Ibrahim is the first female executive chef in the restaurant’s more than seventy year history.

Early life
Ibrahim is the oldest of three children. The family emigrated from the Philippines to Evans, West Virginia when she was six years old. She was an athlete at Elon University, attending on a basketball scholarship. until am injury sidelined her.  After that, she applied to Le Cordon Bleu in San Francisco.

Career
After culinary school, Ibrahim began working at restaurants around the world, working her way up to becoming sous chef at Manresa in California.  She moved to the Basque region of Spain to work for Eneko Atxa at Azurmendi before moving on to its sister restaurant Aziamendi in Thailand as chef de cuisine.  She spent two years planning to open her own restaurant in Bangkok, but Covid forced her to scuttle her plans.

References

American women chefs
LGBT chefs
Filipino chefs
Elon University alumni
Alumni of Le Cordon Bleu
Chefs from Seattle
People from Iligan
Year of birth missing (living people)
Living people